Angamāly Padiyōla is a historic declaration of the Catholic (Paḻayakūṟ) Saint Thomas Christians proclaimed in 1787 at the Great Church of Saint George in Angamāly. This document made a strong appeal to the pope for the consecration of a native bishop for the community and demanded autonomy for their Church which was forcibly brought under the Latin Church's jurisdiction.

History 

The Saint Thomas Christian community was previously in communion with the Church of the East and subject to the ecclesiastical jurisdiction of the Patriarch of Babylon until the death of Metropolitan Abraham. Following the death of the Metropolitan, the Portuguese colonialist Latin missionaries succeeded in organising the Synod of Diamper of 1599, which initiated the forcible latinisation and subjugation of the ancient native Indian Christian community. The oppressive Padroado hierarchy witnessed a turbulent reaction from them in 1653, in the form of the Coonan Cross Oath. In order to pacify the situation and to reunite the revolting Christians, the Pope sent Propaganda Carmelite missionaries. However, the unilateral and arrogant approach of the Carmelites led to the eventual division of the community into Paḻayakūṟ and Pùttènkūṟ factions. 

The Pùttènkūṟ, led by Archdeacon Thoma I continued their revolt and gradually adopted the Miaphysitism and West Syriac Rite of the Syriac Orthodox Church, introduced by bishop Gregorios Abdul Jaleel. 

Meanwhile, the Paḻayakūṟ, who reunited with the Catholic Church were placed under foreign missionaries yet again after the death of their bishop, Palliveettil Chandy. Often the power disputes between the Propaganda Vicariate of Malabar and the Padroado Archdiocese of Cranganore created crisis and parallel jurisdiction among them. Meanwhile, both groups were alike in their treatment of the Saint Thomas Christian community. They were deprived of their autonomy and the latin eccesiastical and liturgical hegemony was imposed. Withstanding all these, they remained steadfast to their East Syriac traditions and struggled to maintain their eccesiastical autonomy. 

The late eighteenth century witnessed an attempt for reunification of both factions of the community under bishop Thoma VI, the leader of the Pùttènkūṟ and the only bishop among both factions, who was ready to reunite with the Catholic Church and  acknowledge the Pope's authority. Thoma VI was being compelled by the Syriac Orthodox delegates led by Baselios Shakrallah Qasabgi, who came to Kerala in 1751, to establish and to enforce the West Syriac Rite and Syriac Orthodoxy among the Pùttènkūṟ.  To materialize the reunification plan, two Paḻayakūṟ priests, Kariyattil Iousep Malpan and Paremmakkal Thoma Kathanar, set their journey to Rome, to meet the Pope and to convey the message of Thoma VI. However, the Propaganda missionaries, who had already achieved the trust of the pope, managed to spoil the efforts at Rome. But, the Portuguese Queen, who was impressed with Kariyattil Iousep for his sincere effort and knowledge, decided to bestow the title of Archbishop of Cranganore upon him using her Padroado rights. Kariyattil Iousep was consecrated as the Archbishop of Cranganore at Lisbon and he received the pallium from the pope. However, the eventual success met with a sudden tragedy at Goa, when Kariyattil Iousep was found dead at the age of forty-nine. 

The Saint Thomas Christians believed that his death was a result of treachery of the Goan eccesiastical authorities, since the latter feared and vehemently opposed a Saint Thomas Christian becoming a bishop for his own community. Paremmakkal Thoma soon took charge as the administrator of the Archdiocese of Cranganore. The Angamāly Padiyōla is a charter signed and inscribed by Saint Thomas Christian leaders from 84 Paḻayakūṟ churches led by Paremmakkal Thoma and gathered at the Great Church of Angamāly to discuss and to decide their future plans. The assembly decided to request the pope and the Portuguese monarch to consecrate Paremmakkal Thoma as the bishop for their community. They also decided to return their allegiance to the Chaldean Patriarchate, if their requests are not fulfilled. They selected twelve priests to assist Paremmakkal in his ecclesiastical responsibilities.

Content

References

Eastern Christianity in India
Saint Thomas Christians
 Syro-Malabar Catholic Church
18th-century Eastern Catholicism
History of Kerala
Catholic Church in India
Church of the East in India
1787 in Christianity
1787 in India
Angamaly
Portuguese in Kerala